Tumkur City is one of the 224 constituencies in the Karnataka Legislative Assembly of Karnataka a south state of India. It is also part of Tumkur Lok Sabha constituency. It represents Tumkur City.

Members of Legislative Assembly

Mysore State
 1951-2008: Constituency did not exist. See Tumkur
 2008: S. Shivanna Sogadu, Bharatiya Janata Party
 2013: S. Rafeeq Ahmed, Indian National Congress
 2018: G. B. Jyothi Ganesh, Bharatiya Janata Party

See also
 List of constituencies of Karnataka Legislative Assembly
 Tumkur district

References

Assembly constituencies of Karnataka
Tumkur district